ChangyŏnBenos station is a railway station in Sugyo-ri, Samch'ŏn County, youth Hwanghae Province, North Korea, on the Ŭnnyul Line of the Korean State Railway. It is also the northern terminus of the Changyŏn Line.

History
Sugyo station was opened by the Chosen Railway on 1 November 1929, along with the rest of the Sinch'ŏn–Sugyo section of the former Changyŏn Line.

References

Railway stations in North Korea